In the second season of the Balkan International Basketball League are competing ten participants from the Republic of Macedonia, Bulgaria, Romania, Serbia and Montenegro.

Teams

Format

Regular season
In the regular season the teams will be divided into two groups, each containing five teams. Each team plays every other team in its group at home and away. The top 4 teams in each group advance to the playoffs. Games will be played from October 10, 2009 to March 3, 2010.

Quarterfinals
The top four teams in each group advance for the quarterfinals. The winner of Group A/Group B will play with the fourth placed team in Group B/Group A and the second placed team in Group A/Group B will play with the third in Group B/Group A.

Final four
The four remaining teams play a semifinal match and the winners of those advance to the final. The losers play in a third-place playoff.

Regular season

Group A

Group B

Quarterfinals
First legs were held on March 18; second legs were on March 24 and March 25

Final four

External links
 BIBL official webpage
 Balkan League standings and livescores

2009-10
2009–10 in European basketball leagues
2009–10 in Serbian basketball
2009–10 in Republic of Macedonia basketball
2009–10 in Romanian basketball
2009–10 in Bulgarian basketball
2009–10 in Montenegrin basketball